Pareuchontha grandimacula is a moth of the family Notodontidae. It is restricted to southern Peru and Bolivia.

References

Moths described in 1902
Notodontidae of South America